This is a list of occurrences of space elevators in fiction. Some depictions were made before the space elevator concept became fully established.

Novels and fairy tales
 Kris Longknife series by Mike Shepherd. Space elevators are ubiquitous across the known galaxy.
2061: Odyssey Three (1987), novel by Arthur C. Clarke. The possibility of a space elevator is realised after a groundbreaking discovery that Jupiter's core (now in fragments around the orbit of Lucifer, the small sun formed by the implosion of Jupiter) had been a solid diamond; as the hardest substance in nature, suddenly available in vast quantities, it facilitates the construction of a solid elevator rather than the more common tether structure previously envisaged
 2312 (2012), novel by Kim Stanley Robinson. Thirty-seven space elevators connect Earth's surface to orbit.
 3001: The Final Odyssey (1997), novel by Arthur C. Clarke. In this novel, a ring habitat now exists around the Earth that is connected to the surface via four inhabitable towers–assumed successors to space elevators
 Across the Sea of Stars, collection by Arthur C. Clarke
 Across the Sea of Suns (1984), novel by Gregory Benford
 Assassin Gambit, novel by William R. Forstchen
 Blake's 7: Archangel, novel by Scott Harrison. While in a hologram simulation of an alien city called Teshak City, a character spots the bottom of a space lift connected to a promontory of rock further down the river.
 Blue Remembered Earth (2012), novel by Alastair Reynolds
 Charlie and the Great Glass Elevator (1972), novel by Roald Dahl. While technically an elevator in space, this may not qualify as a "space elevator."
 Chasm City (2001), novel by Alastair Reynolds
 City of Heaven, novel by Tom Terry depicts a terrorist attack aboard a space elevator
 Coyote Frontier, novel by Allen Steele
 Deepsix, novel by Jack McDevitt. The remains of a space elevator are found on a doomed planet
 The Descent of Anansi, novel by Steven Barnes and Larry Niven
 The Dire Earth Cycle, trilogy by Jason M. Hough
 Drakon, novel by S.M. Stirling. Referred to as the beanstalk
 The End of the Empire, novel by Alexis A. Gilliland
 Feersum Endjinn (1994), novel by Iain M. Banks
 Foreigner (1994), novel by Robert J. Sawyer
 Free Fall (2011), novel by William H. Keith
 Friday (1982), novel by Robert A. Heinlein
 The Fountains of Paradise (1979), novel by Arthur C. Clarke. This novel is primarily about the construction of a space elevator on a mountain top on Earth in a fictionalised version of Sri Lanka.
 The Golden Globe (1998), a novel by John Varley.  Details a journey on a space elevator on an artificial satellite of Uranus called Oberon II, built and maintained by giant spiders spinning material with extreme tensile strength.
 The Gordon Mamon Casebook, five SF murder-mystery stories (Murder On The Zenith Express, Single Handed, The Fall Guy, The Hunt For Red Leicester, and A Night To Remember) by Simon Petrie, set on a string of hotel modules ascending and descending a space elevator that connects Earth with a mega-hotel in geosynchronous orbit. A subsequent novella, Elevator Pitch, shares this setting.
 Hammered (2004), by Elizabeth Bear, features a sex scene on a space elevator.
 Halo: Ghosts of Onyx (2006), novel by Eric S. Nylund. Features the UNSC Centennial Orbital Elevator in Havana, Cuba.
Halo: Contact Harvest, It depicts the Harvest space elevator, which is used to evacuate the population and militia to orbit during the first battle of Harvest
 The Highest Frontier, novel by Joan Slonczewski. A college student rides a space elevator constructed of self-healing cables of anthrax bacilli. The engineered bacteria can regrow the cables when severed by space debris.
 Hothouse (1962), novel by Brian Aldiss.  The space elevator in this novel is in actuality a giant banyan tree, which has grown to enormous size over many millennia.
 I have a Mansion in the Post-Apocalyptic World, web novel by Morning Star LL. Main character, Jiang Chen, after acquiring relevant knowledge (and more or less intact parts) from parallel post-apocalyptic world, eventually builds whole two space elevators on Earth using his company, Celestial Trade.
  Jack and the Skyhook, children's book by Damien Broderick
 Johnny Mackintosh and the Spirit of London, novel by Keith Mansfield. Title character Johnny Mackintosh and sister Clara leave Earth for the first time in a secret space elevator.
 Jumping Off the Planet, novel by David Gerrold
 The Last Theorem (2008), novel by Arthur C. Clarke and Frederik Pohl
 Limit (2009), novel by Frank Schätzing. Used for transporting nuclear fuel between Moon and Earth.
 The Long Mars (2014), novel by Stephen Baxter and Terry Pratchett. In the parallel martian worlds, the existence of the elevator is proven as to be a logical step for a long-gone civilization.
 The Mars Trilogy, a series of novels (Red Mars, Green Mars, and Blue Mars) by Kim Stanley Robinson, depicts space elevators on Earth and on Mars, the cables of which are made of carbon nanotubes manufactured on asteroids and lowered into each planet's atmosphere, using the asteroid as a counterweight. Red Mars depicts what happens when a cable is cut at the asteroid anchor point.
 Marsbound, novel by Joe Haldeman 
 Mercury (2005), novel by Ben Bova about a space elevator sabotage that gets an innocent man exiled from Earth
 Metaplanetary and Superluminal, novels by Tony Daniel
 The Mirrored Heavens, novel by David J. Williams
 The Night Sessions (2008), novel by Ken MacLeod
 The Night's Dawn Trilogy, novels by Peter F. Hamilton
 Old Man's War, novel by John Scalzi. Explicitly established not to be in a physically viable orbit, indicating the government which maintains it is keeping technological secrets from Earth.
 Pillar to the Sky, novel by William R. Forstchen
 Places in the Darkness, novel by Christopher Brookmyre
 Rainbow Mars (1999), novel by Larry Niven with 'beanstalks' on Mars and Earth
 Running the Line - Stories of the Space Elevator, edited by Brad Edwards and David Raitt. Published with Lulu, 2006. The book is a result of the 2nd Clarke-Bradbury International Science Fiction Competition organized by David Raitt of the European Space Agency's Technology Transfer and Promotion Office with the theme of Space Elevators. The competition generated 109 stories and images submitted from 29 different countries. The book contains 35 stories (including the winner and runner up plus three images (including winner and runner up).
 The Science of Discworld, by Terry Pratchett, Jack Cohen and Ian Stewart, in which Roundworld humanity escapes to the stars via an elevator
 Singularity's Ring (2008), novel by Paul Melko
 Songs of Distant Earth (1986), novel by Arthur C. Clarke. The name 'space elevator' is not used in this book and the device used is not suitable for transporting humans. Instead, a kind of very strong cable is used to pull massive blocks of ice up to a spaceship in orbit around a fictitious planet from its surface
 Starclimber (2008), novel by Kenneth Oppel. The main characters go to space using a space elevator.
 Strata (1981), one of Terry Pratchett's two solely science-fiction novels
 Sundiver (1980), novel by David Brin
 Sunstorm (2005), novel by Arthur C. Clarke and Stephen Baxter
 "The Rope Is the World", short story by China Miéville, included in the collection Three Moments of an Explosion: Stories. Depicts the bleaker aspects of space elevators, as the novelty wears off and they become derelict.
 Tour of the Universe, novel by Robert Holdstock and Malcolm Edwards
 The Web Between the Worlds (1980), novel by Charles Sheffield
 Zavtra Nastupit Vechnost (Tomorrow The Eternity Will Come), novel by Russian sci-fi writer Alexander Gromov
 Zmeyonysh (Young Snake), novella by the Alexander Gromov 
Vertikala (The Vertical) (2006), novel by leading Croatian science fiction writer Predrag Raos, who also filed the patent for his solution for "space lift"

Anime, comics, and manga
 Air Gear, the space elevator appears in the manga chapter 333 know that the tower of babel it is mentioned that it is indeed a space elevator 
 Battle Angel Alita, the floating city of Tiphares/Zalem is actually the bottom end of one of two space elevators, each located on the opposite ends of the world and joined by an orbital ring. Its sister city Ketheres/Jeru is at the opposite end of the elevator.
 Biomega, a manga series by Tsutomu Nihei, features a space elevator referred to as the "Intercontinental Mooring Cable."
 Bubblegum Crisis Tokyo 2040, anime series, contains a skyhook throughout the series.
 Cannon God Exaxxion features a space elevator built on Earth using alien technology.
 A Certain Magical Index: The Movie – The Miracle of Endymion features a space elevator called Endymion, based on the Greek mythology of the same name, where the main setting takes place.
 The film is adapted into a manga series, which also features the titular space elevator.
 The third episode of Cyber City Oedo 808 features a space elevator that criminal turned cop Benten rides to investigate a murder.
 Dicebox, web comic, Ch.5. The space elevator, a shimmering thread against the sky, was "obsolete years before we were born", but still a tourist attraction.
 Dirty Pair "Project Eden", anime, a James Bond-like pre-title sequence is set in a climber-car on a space elevator, one such that leads to an orbital ring habitat about an unnamed planet. It and the ring are destroyed by the end of the heroines' visit (but not their fault!).
 Eureka Seven features a starship linked to the Earth's capital by a space elevator.
 Hammer Locke, DC Comics limited series, features a space elevator under construction in mid-21st century Africa.
 Kiddy Grade, anime series, in which a space elevator combined with an Orbital ring structure is used on most populated planets.
 In Kurau: Phantom Memory, space elevators are used as spaceports for easier traveling between the Earth and a full colonized Moon.
 Legend of the Galactic Heroes anime series depicts a space elevator on the planet Phezzan.
 In Mobile Suit Gundam 00, all the superpowers have a space elevator (Permanent Orbital Station) of their own, linked to a Solar Power Satellite array used to harness solar energy for their use. Each elevator has two orbital stations: the lower orbital station functions as a spaceport and tourist attraction while the high orbital station houses the elevator's control facilities and provides physical access to the solar array. The partial destruction of the Africa elevator in the second season reveals that the elevators have ablative armor plates for protection against debris; purging these plates require the technical crew to jettison the counterweight at the orbital end in order to avoid the now-unbalanced elevator's complete destruction. They play a critical plot role in power balance and maintaining spheres of influence by denying electricity to rogue states.
 Nemesis the Warlock, comic strip by Pat Mills, book 4 The Gothic Empire.
 Outlaw Star, anime series, episode 14 "Final Countdown", features the problem of a falling elevator due to a terrorist attack.
 RIXA, Indonesian comic book series, features a rescue mission on Konstantin Space Elevator (tribute to astronautic theorist Konstantin Tsiolkovsky) after a terrorist remote hijack that caused the climber car to malfunction and trapping three Japanese astronauts on 750 km altitude. The space elevator also host an "Interdimensional Portal" on the space station tethered on top.
 Starship Operators, anime series, episode 5 Great Escape, briefly depicts an orbital elevator ride on a fictitious planet.
 The Super Dimension Century Orguss (1983) anime television series features a conflict over a space elevator.
 Tekkaman Blade, anime series, depicts six "orbital elevators" located throughout Earth and locked in space by an orbital ring structure. Every episode deals with the space elevators.
 The 2019 comic reboot of Transformers features a space elevator called the Tether, connecting the planet Cybertron to a geoengineered planetoid called the Winged Moon. The Decepticons eventually collapse the Tether, and its fall wraps it around the planet and causes great damage in the process.
 Turn A Gundam, anime series, depicts an ancient hypersonic skyhook which has been maintained operationally by nanomachines over thousands of years. An ancient mass driver is also used for transporting space-vessels from earth's surface to the skyhook.
 Z.O.E. Dolores,i, anime series, contains an orbital elevator early in the series, and then is the focus of the end, where someone is trying to destroy the counterweights to make the elevator collapse. Intriguing use of emergency counterweights depicted.
 Gundam Reconguista in G is a Gundam mecha anime television series (2014-2015) with the plot centering on an advanced space elevator.

Games
 2300 AD, role-playing game by Game Designers' Workshop.
 Ace Combat 7: Skies Unknown, a Bandai Namco game, features the International Space Elevator (ISEV). Also known as Lighthouse.
 The Android detective board game includes a space elevator.
 From Software's Armored Core 2 and Armored Core 2: Another Age feature space elevators named "Rapture" above both Earth and Mars.
 Blue Planet featured a space elevator located in Ecuador that is destroyed by terrorists during the dark years of the Blight.
 Call of Duty: Advanced Warfare features a space elevator in the multiplayer map Ascend.
 Cities: Skylines features a space elevator as one of the wonders the player can construct. It is used to increase tourism to the city. Oddly, the in-game model lacks a tether.
 Civilization: Call to Power and Sid Meier's Civilization IV, strategy video game, as a Wonder of the World.
 Contra: Hard Corps, Colonel Bahamut takes the Alien Cell to the top of his personal Space Elevator with plans of using its power for world domination.
 Eclipse Phase, some space elevators had been built from earth to the orbit or space stations, but except one were destroyed during a war between man and machine.
 Freelancer, a space elevator transports small ships from orbit to the surface of planets.
 The video game Final Star Force includes a stage with a space elevator.
 Front Mission: Gun Hazard, video game by Square, features the Orbital Elevator "A.T.L.A.S.".
 Front Mission Evolved, a videogame by Square Enix, features an Orbital Elevator.
 F-Zero GX, futuristic racing game, has a course called Cosmo Terminal: Trident which is set inside an interplanetary space elevator several hundred kilometers wide bound for Zero Station. During the final lap it reaches its destination and stops.
 Halo 2, Halo 3, and Halo 3: ODST video games by Bungie, depict a space elevator in New Mombasa, Kenya in the year 2552. The elevator is toppled during the Battle of Earth in Halo 2/Halo 3: ODST, and its ruins are encountered during operations in the Battle of Voi in Halo 3. The 'Halo 3 Multiplayer Map "Orbital" also depicts a space elevator over Quito, Ecuador. Halo: Reach depicts three slightly different orbital elevators in the distance of the city 'New Alexandria' on the human colony Reach, but they aren't accessible in the game. Halo 5 features a space elevator on another planet as a location during the elevator's destruction. Halo Infinite depicts a space elevator in the background of the multiplayer map Bazaar, which also takes place in New Mombasa as it is being rebuilt after the events of the original trilogy. 
 Killzone 3, a first person shooter by Guerrilla Games, depict a space elevator on the planet of Helghan. The protagonists use it to stop the Helghast fleet from destroying Earth. 
 Sid Meier's Alpha Centauri, strategy video game, allows players to build a "Secret Project" entitled the "Space Elevator".
 Sonic Colors, Platformer by Sega. Dr. Eggman creates an orbital elevator which reaches out to a giant intergalactic amusement park consisting of a spherical main body with several planet-sized attractions tethered to it via giant energy chains.
 Syndicate Wars, a videogame by Bullfrog Productions, featured an "orbital elevator" which was actually a lunar space elevator.
 The Moment of Silence, an adventure video game by The Adventure Company, lets you ride a space elevator based in New York City
 Transhuman Space, role-playing game by Steve Jackson Games. In this setting, a first space elevator had been built on Mars and the second one, on Earth, is on the way.
 Martian Rails, a crayon rail system game by Mayfair Games pays tribute to the Mars Trilogy with a "Cable Breaks" event that destroys everything on the equator.
 Mega Man X8, Action game by Capcom. An Orbital Elevator known as "Jakob" is used to transport Reploids and materials to the moon to prepare it for colonization, and is at the center of the game's conflict.
 Mega Man X Command Mission, RPG by Capcom. The final moments of the game before the final boss' final form takes place in an Orbital Elevator named "Babel"
 Mega Man Zero series, Action game by Capcom. In the series, all important Government locations are sited atop orbital elevators in stationary satellites, and multiple elevators can be seen from the elevator Area X-ll in Mega Man Zero 3. The Neo Arcadia Tower present in the first game is also the remains of an elevator damaged in the wars past, hollowed out and laid with traps to foil intruders.
 Independence War or I-War, a space simulation game by Particle Systems A multiple tether space elevator is shown in the introduction movie when President King is transported into space aboard a crawler.
 Bandai Namco Entertainment's role-playing video game series Xenosaga features a gigantic space station in orbit above Federation capital planet of Fifth Jerusalem. Episode III reveals that the station is tethered to the ground by a space elevator.
 The space elevator "Babel" appears in Battle Clash and its sequel as the last great construction project completed before the apocalypse, and serves as the only surviving route to outer space.
 Street Fighter X Tekken and Ultra Street Fighter IV feature a space elevator as one of the stages, referred to as "Cosmic Elevator."
 In Xenoblade Chronicles 2, the final episode of the game takes place in a space station called Rhadamanthus, high above the World Tree, a landmark object on the planet on which the game is set. It is revealed through the course of events in the game that the World Tree, initially thought to be a giant tree, is actually a space elevator constructed by the advanced human civilization that came before those of the protagonists. The civilization was destroyed by Klaus' conduit experiment when it created the first Xenoblade Chronicles universe and sent Klaus' left half to that universe, leaving his right half on Earth, as the new God/Architect orbiting the Earth on board the Rhadamanthus on top of the World Tree. It is also implied/revealed that the planet the game takes place on is actually Earth. At the end of the game, the World Tree space elevator along with the Rhadamanthus station orbiting above are destroyed.
 Satisfactory, a factory game by Coffee Stain Studios Features a Space Elevator related to the game-end objective, "Project Assembly". Sending required resources up the space elevator unlocks a new technology tier, and is used to progress in the game.
 Surviving Mars, a city-building game by Haemimont Games, lets you construct a Space Elevator which makes resupplying and exporting materials cheaper and faster than a rocket.

Movies and TV series
 Kaena: The Prophecy, a CG movie featuring an orbital "tree" comparable with a space elevator.
 Kamen Rider Kabuto Movie God Speed Love
 Mystery Science Theater 3000, television series, Dr. Clayton Forrester attaches a tether to the Satellite of Love called the "Umbilicus", turning the SOL into a space elevator. In subsequent episodes, experiments would be sent up the umbilicus for the show's weekly "Invention exchange" skit.  It is suggested that the Umbilicus is an extension of Gypsy's hoselike body.
 Star Trek: Voyager, episode "Rise"
 In Doctor Who, "The Waters of Mars" it is mentioned by Ed Gold (Peter O'Brian) the second-in-command to Adelaide Brook (Lindsay Duncan), the Doctor's then-new companion that a space elevator was constructed off the coast of Western Australia in the year 2044.
 In Mr. Nobody people descend to the surface of Mars from a docked spaceship via space elevator. 
 In the animated television show Generator Rex the international organization Providience has constructed a space elevator.
 In Halo 4: "Forward Unto Dawn", the Corbulo Academy of Military Science on Circinius IV had an orbital space elevator in the middle of the academy.  The elevator was destroyed by the Covenant during the opening moments of the Battle of Circinius IV while the academy was in evacuation, killing everyone on the elevator so far.
 Payload - a short film about scavengers set in a space elevator town. Written and directed by Stuart Willis, produced by Tom Bicknell in 2011.
In the TV series Foundation, the planet Trantor has a space elevator called “Starbridge”, which is destroyed by terrorists in the opening episode “The Emperor’s Peace”.

Others
 Globus Cassus, a proposed Terraforming project that uses four space elevators during its construction.
 Star Wars: Shadows of the Empire, a multimedia project, features a skyhook in orbit around Coruscant. More such skyhooks are mentioned in other Star Wars stories.
In the GURPS Transhuman Space role-playing game source book about Mars in the year 2100, In The Well, they have placed a completed orbital elevator (Beanstalk) on Pavonis Mons, linked to Deimos. There is also a beanstalk beginning construction on Mount Kenya.
The board game, Buck Rogers - Battle for the 25th Century (1988) featured a space elevator connecting the Mars territory of Pavonis to the Far Mars Orbit and the moon, Deimus.
 Jovian Chronicles, a Role-playing game by Dream Pod 9, includes the wreckage of a Martian space elevator.  The elevator was destroyed by terrorists in the published scenario included with the original release of the setting.  The wreckage created the "'Vator Crater", a long canyon running along the Martian equator.
 Space 220, a restaurant at the Mission: SPACE pavilion at Walt Disney World's Epcot, features the Stellarvator, a simulated space elevator ride taking guests from the park to the orbiting Centauri Space Station the restaurant is located in.

See also 

 Lunar space elevator for the moon variant
 Space elevator construction discusses alternative construction methods of a space elevator.
 Space elevator economics discusses capital and maintenance costs of a space elevator.
 Space elevator safety discusses safety aspects of space elevator construction and operation.
 Launch loop - a hypervelocity belt system that forms a launch track at 80 km
 Lightcraft - an alternative method for moving materials or people
 Space gun - a method for launching materials
 Space fountain - very tall structures using fast moving masses to hold it up
 Space tether - methods using long boluses
 Non-rocket spacelaunch

References

Elevators
Fiction
Fiction about transport
Works set in elevators